The Omaha Mavericks men's soccer team represents the University of Nebraska Omaha in NCAA Division I men's soccer competitions. The Mavericks compete in The Summit League.

History 
The men's varsity soccer program began ahead of the 2011 NCAA Division I men's soccer season, where Omaha competed as an independent school. Jason Mims was the first coach of the program, who managed the team for first seven seasons of the program's existence. In 2012, Omaha joined the Summit League, where it established itself as one of the top schools in the conference. In the 2016 Summit League Men's Soccer Tournament, Omaha reached the championship, before falling to eventual College Cup finalists, Denver. The following season, the Mavericks reached the final of the 2017 Summit League Men's Soccer Tournament, where they beat Denver in the championship, earning their first ever NCAA Division I Men's Soccer Tournament berth. There, the Mavericks were eliminated in the first round by FIU.

On March 28, 2018, head coach Jason Mims resigned to accept to an administrative position with Major League Soccer club, Real Salt Lake. Mims was replaced by veteran coach, Bob Warming on April 2, 2018. In his third season as coach, the Mavericks returned to the NCAA Division I Men's Soccer Tournament.  Omaha finished second in the conference standings but the two games with Denver were canceled due to COVID protocols in the Pioneers camp.  If Omaha would have won the two unplayed games, they would have been outright conference champions.  COVID protocols kept Denver out of the 2020 NCAA Division I Men's Soccer Tournament and the Mavericks were selected as the replacement team.

Rivalries 
The main rival for Omaha is Creighton University, the only other NCAA Division I men's soccer program in Nebraska. The rivalry is known as the "Dodge Street Derby".

Dodge Street Derby (Creighton) 

Source: Creighton Men's Soccer Record Book

Roster

Players 
As of September 2, 2020

Coaching staff 
Head coach— Bob Warming
Assistant coach— Grant Warming
Goalkeeper coach— Ugo Tritz
Strength & Conditioning coach— Matt Grosey
Athletic trainer— Trenton Royse

Seasons 

 During the 2020 season, the Summit League men's soccer tournament was not held because of the ongoing COVID-19 pandemic, and the regular season champion would represent the league in the NCAA men's soccer tournament. Omaha finished second in the Summit League standings behind Denver. Omaha's two regular season games with Denver were postponed, and later cancelled due to COVID cases within the Denver program; if Omaha had won those games, they would have been the Summit League regular season champions. On Tuesday, April 20, 2021, Denver announced that they were withdrawing from the NCAA men's soccer tournament "due to COVID-19 protocols," and would be replaced by Omaha. On April 29, 2021, Omaha defeated Denver's intended opponent, 23rd-ranked UNC Greensboro, 3 to 2 for the program's first-ever NCAA men's soccer tournament win.

Notes

References

External links 
 

 
Soccer clubs in Nebraska
2011 establishments in Nebraska
Association football clubs established in 2011